is a former Japanese football player.

Playing career
Watanabe was born in Ibaraki Prefecture on November 9, 1971. After graduating from high school, he joined Fujita Industries in 1990. He played several matches from first season and he played many matches as center back from 1992. The club won the champions in 1993 and was promoted to J1 League from 1994. From 1994, he became a regular player and the club won the champions 1994 Emperor's Cup. In 1996, he moved to Cerezo Osaka. However he could not play many matches. In 1997, he moved to Japan Football League club Consadole Sapporo. He played as regular player. The club won the champions in 1997 and was promoted to J1 League from 1998. In 1999, he moved to Japan Football League club Mito HollyHock based in his local. The club won the 3rd place in 1999 and was promoted to J2 League from 2000. In 2001, he moved to J2 club Montedio Yamagata. He retired end of 2002 season.

Club statistics

References

External links

1971 births
Living people
Association football people from Ibaraki Prefecture
Japanese footballers
Japan Soccer League players
J1 League players
J2 League players
Japan Football League (1992–1998) players
Japan Football League players
Shonan Bellmare players
Cerezo Osaka players
Hokkaido Consadole Sapporo players
Mito HollyHock players
Montedio Yamagata players
Association football defenders